Gompholobium marginatum is a species of flowering plant in the family Fabaceae and is endemic to the south-west of Western Australia. It is a prostrate or low, spreading shrub with palmate leaves and uniformly yellow, pea-like flowers.

Description

Taxonomy
Gompholobium marginatum was first formally described in 1811 by Robert Brown in Hortus Kewensis. The specific epithet (marginatum) means "furnished with a border", referring to the thickened edge of the leaves.

Distribution and habitat
Gompholobium marginatum grows in gravelly or granitic soils in the Avon Wheatbelt, Esperance Plains, Geraldton Sandplains, Jarrah Forest, Mallee, Swan Coastal Plain and Warren biogeographic regions of south-western Western Australia.

Conservation status
Gompholobium marginatum is classified as "not threatened" by the Western Australian Government Department of Parks and Wildlife.

References

marginatum
Eudicots of Western Australia
Plants described in 1811
Taxa named by Robert Brown (botanist, born 1773)